Mining and hydroelectric projects in Panama are heavily discussed topics in Panama due to several laws for the protection of the native inhabitants and the neo-liberal plans of the government. Since the beginning of 2011 large protests against such mining and hydroelectric projects have been held by the indigenous inhabitants of Panama.

History 
The hydroelectric potential of the Bocas del Torro region was discovered in the 1970s. However, the first 70 hydroelectric power plants were built in 1998 after the privatization of Panama's Institute of Hydroelectric Resources and Electrification (IRHE). For the approval of following hydroelectric projects the Panamanian government and private investors negotiated, in accordance with Law 127, with the indigenous representatives. Corruption, involuntary resettlement of the villages, and penetration of the local politics by the Panamanian government, however, led to the first protests against hydroelectric power plants and mining in the 1990s.

Recently these protests received more attention. On 11 February 2011 the government of Ricardo Martinelli approved the neo-liberal Law 8, also known as the Ley Minera, which made it possible for foreign companies to invest directly in Panamanian concessions. This resulted, during the months of February, March, and May 2011, in large protests by the native Ngäbe Buglé people who felt the threat of hydrologic colonialism which would affect their political authority in the comarca and destruct the environment.

The start of hydroelectric projects in the comarca and the annexed regions in early January 2012 led to large scale indigenous protests and the blocking of the Inter-American Highway. On 5 February 2012 the indigenous people from the north-western part of Panama clashed with the riot police while blocking the Pan-American Highway near San Felix.

On this day 150 Ngäbe Buglé were arrested and 40 got injured, of which three persons died within a week. The repression of the protests by the police seems to be a form of  green authoritarianism, which stands for the involvement of the state to secure and protect renewable energy sources and “market valorized ecological processes”. However, this does not only happen with the use of explicit violence as is the case here. The increasing influence of the national government in the native political elections, which occurs in Panama since 2010 by changing the  Carta Organica, is also a hidden form of  green authoritarianism.

On the 7th of February, two days after the conflict between the police and the indigenous people, the San Lorenzo treaty was signed, of which the most important points hold that: (a.) the government would participate in a discussion with the Ngäbe Buglé on the new Ley Minera and the hydroelectric projects with the Catholic church as mediator between the two parties, (b.) the Ngäbe Buglé would cease their blockade and the riot police would withdrawal, (c.) cellular communication would be restored, (d.) the 150 captured protesters would be released, and (e.) the families of killed Ngäbe Buglé would be compensated.

During February the Pan-American Highway was closed several times again in the north-western part of the country due to continuing protests of the Ngäbe Buglé. At the same time the dialogue between representatives of the state and the Ngäbe Buglé continued in Panama City. The Ngäbe Buglé people were represented by their officially elected general cacique Silvia Carrera. Division in the Ngäbe-Buglé politics, however, caused that not all agreed with the leadership on Carrera which led to smaller protests in parts of the Ngäbe Buglé region.

Legal issues 
It seems that the U.N. Declaration on the Rights of Indigenous Peoples, which was ratified by Panama in 2007, is in conflict with the in 2011 approved Law 8. The U.N. Declaration of Rights of Indigenous Peoples holds that “states shall consult and cooperate in good faith with the indigenous peoples concerned through their own representative institutions in order to obtain their free and informed consent prior to the approval of any project affecting their lands or territories and other resources, particularly in connection with the development, utilization, or exploitation of their mineral, water, or other resources”. Law 8, however, holds that “[f]oreign state-owned mining companies are allowed to invest directly in Panamanian concessions”.

This means that foreign companies are able to undertake large mining projects on Panamanian terrain, including the land within the  comarcas, without consultation of the indigenous inhabitants. This in itself is in conflict with article 127 of the Panamanian constitution, which deals with the  comarca structure as will be explained below. It seems as if the increasing laws for the protection of indigenous rights and the laws for trade liberalization are conflicting commitments.

The Comarca Ngöbe Buglé 
The Comarca Ngöbe Buglé was founded in 1997 with the approval of Law 10. The  comarca structure is borrowed from the Kuna  comarca system and follows a similar political organization which is accepted as legitimate by the Panamanian government. Article 127 of the Panamanian constitution states that the Government will guarantee the indigenous communities the grounds and the collective property in order to accomplish their economic and social wealth. The Law will regulate the procedures for these land delimitations, in which private land ownership is prohibited. According to Article 48 and 57 of CH II of the  Carta Organica the indigenous authorities need to approve any projects of environmental exploitation by submitting them to a referendum.

Current developments 
After months of protests, street blockades, and negotiations with the United Nations as mediator between the two parties, president Martinelli finally repealed Law 8 on 3 March 2012. This was followed by the approval of the new Law 415 which ensured that mining is banned from the  comarca. This decision resulted in the cancellation of 25 pending mining requests in the Ngäbe-Buglé region.

The new law stresses that hydroelectric projects may only be constructed after the approval of, and in collaboration with, the natives. In reaction to the approval of the new law, general cacique Silvia Carrera apologized for the street closures and the many demonstrations. Though the indigenous negotiators are satisfied with the results, others feel defeated as hydroelectric projects are still not totally banned from the region.

Notes

References 
Constitución Política de la República de Panamá 2004, Gaceta Oficial No. 25, 176, Año CI Panamá, R. Panamá Lunes 15 de Noviembre de 2004 http://www.oas.org/juridico/mla/sp/pan/sp_pan-int-text-const.pdf accessed on 04/05/2012
Finley-Brook and Thomas 2011. Renewable Energy and Human Rights Violations: Illustrative Cases from Indigenous Territories in Panama,  Annals of the Association of American Geographers , Vol.101(4), pp. 863–872
La Estrella, Panamanian Newspaper, https://web.archive.org/web/20120510033429/http://www.laestrella.com.pa/online/inicio.asp accessed on 04/05/2012
La Prensa, Panamanian newspaper, http://www.prensa.com accessed on 04/05/2012
Mineweb.com http://www.mineweb.com/mineweb/view/mineweb/en/page68?oid=148100&sn=Detail&pid=68 accessed on 01/05/2012
San Lorenzo Treaty, published online by La Prensa http://www.prensa.com/sites/default/files/updata/2012/02/07/docs/ACUERDOSANLORENZO.pdf) accessed on 03/04/2012
Simms and Moolji 2011.  In the Belly of the Machine , ENVR 451 Final Report Prepared for McGill University, Centro de Incidencia Ambiental (CIAM), The Smithsonian Institution and the Comarca Ngöbe-Buglé https://web.archive.org/web/20140812224210/https://secureweb.mcgill.ca/pfss/sites/mcgill.ca.pfss/files/in_the_belly_of_the_machine.pdf accessed on the 22/03/2012
United Nations 2008. U.N. Declaration on the Rights of Indigenous People 2007, Published by the United Nations 07-58681, March 2008, 4,000 http://www.un.org/esa/socdev/unpfii/documents/DRIPS_en.pdf accessed on 04/05/2012

Mining in Panama